"Tin Soldier" is a 17,500-word science fiction novella by American writer Joan D. Vinge, her first published work.

It was originally published in Orbit 14, edited by Damon Knight, in 1974. "Tin Soldier" was first reprinted in the 1977 anthology Women of Wonder, edited by Pamela Sargent.

Plot

"Tin Soldier" tells the story of Maris, an ex-soldier who, following wounds sustained in battle, has received cybernetic implants that, as a side effect, slow his aging to "about five years for every hundred" (he is 115 years old as the story begins, though physically he looks "about twenty-five"), and Brandy (short for Branduin), a female starship crew member.

Maris has started a bar named "Tin Soldier" in the spaceport town of New Piraeus. None of his customers know his real name and call him "Tin Soldier" – or "Soldier" for short – after his bar.

Only women are allowed to crew starships, since male bodies cannot handle the stresses of space travel. Since trips between star systems require decades (while the female crew do not age due to relativistic effects), Soldier does a brisk business among starship crews because, apparently never ageing, he is the only familiar face they can see, decade after decade, whenever they come into port.

Brandy is "maybe eighteen" and assigned to her ship which only visits Soldier's planet every 25 years, when she first meets Soldier. Because of the relativistic effects of space travel, she only ages a few years between visits, while Soldier ages even less.

The novella follows the relationship that develops between two people who fall in love, but through circumstances can only see each other for a few days every 25 years.

Popularity

As the author said in the introduction to "Tin Soldier" published in the 1979 Vinge collection Eyes of Amber and Other Stories:

Inspiration

According to Joan Vinge, "Tin Soldier" had two primary inspirations. The first was the song "Brandy (You're a Fine Girl)" by the band Looking Glass, which had been a Billboard Hot 100 #1 hit in 1972, shortly before Vinge wrote the story. The second, as the title suggests, was Hans Christian Andersen's short story "The Steadfast Tin Soldier" and its tale of a crippled toy soldier who falls in love with a paper ballerina.

Vinge commented:

The George R. R. Martin story also inspired by "Brandy" is "Fast Friend" and was collected in Sandkings.

References

American science fiction novels
Works based on The Steadfast Tin Soldier